FMHS may refer to:
Fayetteville-Manlius High School, a public high school in Manlius, New York, USA
Flower Mound High School, a public high school in Flower Mound, Texas, USA
Fort Myers Senior High School, a public high school in Fort Myers, Florida, USA
Fruita Monument High School, a public high school in Fruita, Colorado, USA
Fort Mill High School,a public high school in Fort Mill, South Carolina, USA
Frank McCourt High School, a public high school in the Upper West Side, New York City, NY, USA